(Latin for "master of soldiers", plural ) was a top-level military command used in the later Roman Empire, dating from the reign of Constantine the Great. The term referred to the senior military officer (equivalent to a war theatre commander, the emperor remaining the supreme commander) of the empire. In Greek sources, the term is translated either as strategos or as stratelates.

Establishment and development of the command 

The title of magister militum was created in the 4th century, when the emperor Constantine the Great deprived the praetorian prefects of their military functions. Initially two posts were created, one as head of the infantry, as the magister peditum ("master of foot"), and one for the more prestigious cavalry, the magister equitum ("master of horse"). The latter title had existed since republican times, as the second-in-command to a Roman dictator.

Under Constantine's successors, the title was also established at a territorial level: magistri peditum and magistri equitum were appointed for every praetorian prefecture (per Gallias, per Italiam, per Illyricum, per Orientem), and, in addition, for Thrace and, sometimes, Africa. On occasion, the offices would be combined under a single person, then styled magister equitum et peditum or magister utriusque militiae ("master of both forces").

As such they were directly in command of the local mobile field army of the comitatenses, which acted as a rapid reaction force. Other magistri remained at the immediate disposal of the emperors, and were termed in praesenti ("in the presence" of the emperor). By the late 4th century, the regional commanders were termed simply magister militum.

In the Western Roman Empire, a "commander-in-chief" evolved with the title of magister utriusque militiae often abbreviated MVM. This powerful office was often the power behind the throne and was held by Stilicho, Flavius Aetius, Ricimer, and others. In the east, there were two senior generals, who were each appointed to the office of magister militum praesentalis.

During the reign of Emperor Justinian I, with increasing military threats and the expansion of the Eastern Empire, three new posts were created: the magister militum per Armeniam in the Armenian and Caucasian provinces, formerly part of the jurisdiction of the magister militum per Orientem, the magister militum per Africam in the reconquered African provinces (534), with a subordinate magister peditum, and the magister militum Spaniae (c. 562).

In the course of the 6th century, internal and external crises in the provinces often necessitated the temporary union of the supreme regional civil authority with the office of the magister militum. In the establishment of the exarchates of Ravenna and Carthage in 584, this practice found its first permanent expression. Indeed, after the loss of the eastern provinces to the Muslim conquest in the 640s, the surviving field armies and their commanders formed the first themata.

Supreme military commanders sometimes also took this title in early medieval Italy, for example in the Papal States and in Venice, whose Doge claimed to be the successor to the Exarch of Ravenna.

List of magistri militum

Unspecified commands 
 383–385/8: Flavius Bauto, magister militum under Valentinian II
 385/8–394: Arbogast, magister militum under Valentinian II and Eugenius
 383–388: Andragathius
 ?–480: Ovida

Comes et magister utriusque militiae 
 392–408: Flavius Stilicho
 411–421: Flavius Constantius
 422–425: Castinus
 425–430: Flavius Constantius Felix
 431–432: Bonifacius
 432–433: Sebastianus
 433–454: Flavius Aetius
 455–456: Avitus and Remistus 
 456: Messianus 
 456–472: Ricimer
 472–473: Gundobad
 475: Ecdicius Avitus
 475–476: Orestes

Per Gallias 
 352–355: Claudius Silvanus
 362–364: Jovinus, magister equitum under Julian and Jovian
 ?–419: Gaudentius
 425–430: Flavius Aetius
 435–439: Litorius
 452–458: Agrippinus
 458–461: Aegidius
 461/462: Agrippinus
 462-473: Gundioc
 ?–472: Bilimer

Per Hispanias 
 441–442: Astyrius
 443: Merobaudes
 446: Vitus

Per Ilyricum 
 ?–350: Vetranio, magister peditum under Constans
 361: Iovinus, magister equitum under Julian
 365–375: Equitius, magister utriusquae militiae under Valentinian I
 395–? Alaric I
 448/9 Agintheus (known from Priscus of Panium to have held office as the latter's embassy proceeded towards the court of Attila).
 468–474: Julius Nepos
 477–479: Onoulphus
 479–481: Sabinianus Magnus
 528: Ascum
 529–530/1: Mundus (1st time)
 532–536: Mundus (2nd time)
 c. 538: Justin
 c. 544: Vitalius
 c. 550: John
 568–569/70: Bonus
 581–582: Theognis

Per Orientem
 c. 347: Flavius Eusebius, magister utriusquae militiae
 349–359: Ursicinus, magister equitum under Constantius
 359–360: Sabinianus, magister equitum under Constantius II
 363–367: Lupicinus, magister equitum under Jovian and Valens
 371–378: Iulius, magister equitum et Peditum under Valens
 383: Richomeres, magister equitum et peditum
 383–388: Ellebichus, magister equitum et peditum
 392: Eutherius, magister equitum et peditum
 393–396: Addaeus, magister equitum et peditum
 395/400: Fravitta
 433–446: Anatolius
 447–451: Zeno
 460s: Flavius Ardabur Aspar
 –469: Flavius Iordanes
 469–471: Zeno
 483–498: Ioannes Scytha
 c. 503–505: Areobindus Dagalaiphus Areobindus
 505–506: Pharesmanes
 ?516–?518: Hypatius
 ?518–529: Diogenianus
 520–525/526: Hypatius
 527: Libelarius
 527–529: Hypatius
 529–531: Belisarius
 531: Mundus
 532–533: Belisarius
 540: Buzes
 542: Belisarius
 543–544: Martinus
 549–551: Belisarius
 555: Amantius
 556: Valerianus
 569: Zemarchus
 572–573: Marcian
 573: Theodorus
 574: Eusebius
 574/574–577: Justinian
 577–582: Maurice
 582–583: John Mystacon
 584–587/588: Philippicus
 588: Priscus
 588–589: Philippicus
 589–591: Comentiolus
 591–603: Narses
 603–604 Germanus
 604–605 Leontius
 605–610 Domentziolus

Per Armeniam
Sittas
Peter, direct predecessor of John Tzibus
John Tzibus (?–541)
Valerian
Dagisthaeus (?–550)
Bessas (550–554)
Martin
Justin
Heraclius the Elder (c. 595)

Per Thracias 
 377–378: Saturninus, magister equitum under Valens
 377–378: Traianus, magister peditum under Valens
 378: Sebastianus, magister peditum under Valens
 380–383: Flavius Saturninus, magister peditum under Theodosius I
 392–393: Stilicho, magister equitum et peditum
 412–414: Constans
 441: Ioannes the Vandal, magister utriusque militiae
 464–467/468: Basiliscus
 468–474: Armatus 
 474: Heraclius of Edessa
 511: Hypatius
 512– 513: Cyrillus
  513– 515: Alathar
 515: Vitalian
 525-c. 530: Germanus
 530–533: Chilbudius
 550–c. 554: Artabanes
 588: Priscus (1st time)
 593: Priscus (2nd time)
 593–594: Peter (1st time)
 594–c. 598: Priscus (2nd time)
 598–601: Comentiolus
 601–602: Peter (2nd time)

Praesentalis
 351–361: Arbitio, magister equitum under Constantius II
 361–363: Nevitta, magister equitum under Julian
 363–379: Victor, magister equitum under Valens
 366–378: Flavius Arinthaeus, magister peditum under Valens
 364–369: Flavius Iovinus, magister equitum under Valentinian I
 364–366: Dagalaifus, magister peditum under Valentinian I
 367–372: Severus, magister peditum under Valentinian I
 369–373: Flavius Theodosius, magister equitum under Valentinian I
 375–388: Merobaudes, magister peditum under Valentinian I, Gratian and Magnus Maximus
 388–395: Timasius
 394–408: Stilicho, magister equitum et peditum
 399–400: Gainas
 400: Fravitta
 409: Varanes and Arsacius
 419–: Plinta
 434–449: Areobindus?
 443–451: Apollonius
 450–451: Anatolius
 475–477/478: Armatus
 485–: Longinus
 492–499: John the Hunchback
 518–520: Vitalian 
 520–?: Justinian
 528: Leontius
 528–529: Phocas
 520–538/9: Sittas
 536: Germanus
 536: Maxentianus
 546–548: Artabanes
 548/9–552: Suartuas
 562: Constantinianus (uncertain)
 582: Germanus (uncertain)
 585–c. 586: Comentiolus
 626: Bonus (uncertain)

Per Africam

Western Empire 
 373–375: Flavius Theodosius, magister equitum 
 386–398: Gildo, magister equitum et peditum

Eastern Empire 
 534–536: Solomon
 536–539: Germanus
 539–544: Solomon
 544–546: Sergius
 545–546: Areobindus
 546: Artabanes
 546–552: John Troglita
 578–590: Gennadius

Magister militae in Byzantine and medieval Italy

Venice
 8th century: Marcellus 
 737: Domenico Leoni under Leo III the Isaurian
 738: Felice Cornicola under Leo III the Isaurian
 739: Theodatus Hypatus under Leo III the Isaurian
 741: Ioannes Fabriacius under Leo III the Isaurian
 764–787: Mauricius Galba

Later, less formal use of the term

By the 12th century, the term was being used to describe a man who organized the military force of a political or feudal leader on his behalf. In the Gesta Herwardi, the hero is several times described as magister militum by the man who translated the original Old English account into Medieval Latin. It seems possible that the writer of the original version, now lost, thought of him as the hereward' ( and ) – the supervisor of the military force. That this later use of these terms was based on the classical concept seems clear.

See also 
 Structural history of the Roman military

References

Citations

Sources 

 
 Prosopography of the Later Roman Empire (PLRE), Vols. I-III

 
Ancient Roman titles
Positions of authority
Byzantine military offices
Late Roman military ranks
Military ranks